Farnan is an Irish surname. Outside of the British Isles, it is most prevalent in North America and Australia.

Notable people with this surname include:
 Bill Farnan, Australian boxer
 Jim Farnan, Australian footballer
 Joseph James Farnan Jr., American judge
 Mike Farnan, Canadian politician
 Pat Farnan, Australian footballer
 Poppy Farnan, British competitor in Love Island (2015 TV series)
 Robert Farnan (rower), American rower
 Robert Farnan (physician), Irish gynaecologist
 Tommy Farnan, New Zealand footballer

References